Bajaao Music Pvt. Ltd. is an Indian online retailer of musical instruments, studio equipment, DJ gear, lighting, cinema sound, and pro audio equipment. The company began in 2005, when Ashutosh Pande founded the website Bajaao.com, a portal to sell musical instruments in India with a vision of supporting musicians in India. In 2015, the Bajaao Music portal recorded substantial growth in sales and became the largest online musical instrument retailer in India. The company headquarters is in Mumbai, India.

In February 2011, with its first round of investor funding, Bajaao.com raised 25 crore for growth and expansion. According to The Hindu, the company again raised 35 crore in 2014 from two US investors to expand the company's operations in small towns and add more musical instruments, categories, and labels. Bajaao has seen significant growth since 2013. The company is reported to have doubled their registered user and around 350% in terms of revenue.

History
Bajaao Music Pvt. Ltd was founded when Ashutosh Pande got the idea to start an eCommerce platform for retailing musical instruments when he noticed several musicians were facing problems due to the limited number of instrument dealers and some of them expressed this to him. He decided to create an online platform initially with 500 products. The company also entered into allied services including the studio equipment business, consultancy services, public broadcasting systems and help in conducting music events.

Bajaao Music Pvt Ltd has three business units – N.O.C. – a 24/7 practice studio for musicians started in 2006, B69, a venue for independent music artists, and BAJAAO Consulting & Entertainment Private Limited. The company has worked with Walt Disney Studio, Sony Music, Casio, Specialty Restaurants Ltd and Maharashtra Government. In 2014, Bajaao Consulting & Entertainment Private Limited announced a new partnership with Hard rock Cafe to assist and manage artists performing at various stages across the country. As of 2014, the company retails 16,000 musical instruments, accessories, and products across India through its online portal.

Funding
Initially, Ashutosh Pande took the seed capital of ₹4,00,000 from his family and friends and leased an 80 sq ft office at Andheri, Mumbai. He raised Rs. 11 lakh from investors as angel funding. To expand its reach in small markets and launch its own private label Vault, Bajaao Music Pvt. Ltd successfully raised ₹3.5 crore led by US based investors.

In-house Products
Bajaao launched Vault guitars in 2011, a line of budget-priced instruments. The company makes sound proofing equipment for studios and home recording in India, and makes cases and gig-bags for guitars, processors, drums, and other musical instruments.

BAJAAO Entertainment
BAJAAO Entertainment (formerly known as Bajaao Consulting and Entertainment Private Limited) is the events and services division of Bajaao. It works primarily as an entertainment agency that creates brand experiences, undertakes event production, programming, artist management, sound rentals, and digital marketing. It also provides acoustic and audio visual consultancy services. They are best known for BIG69, a music festival dedicated to rock and heavy metal music headlined by 5 international bands.

Recognition
Bajaao Music Pvt Ltd gained recognition as the sole gear and sound partner in Bollywood Musical film Aashiqui-2.

Ashutosh Pande also appeared on CNBC Young Turks in 2007, an Indian show on entrepreneurship.

The company organized BIG69, India's first heavy-metal festival, with international artists like Carcass, SikTh, Fleshgod Apocalypse, Hacktivist, and Underside along with other popular Indian bands.

In 2012, Music Trades Magazine ranked Bajaao.com among the world's top 20 music retailers.

References

External links
 Official website

Online retailers of India